The 1947 South Dakota State Jackrabbits football team was an American football team that represented South Dakota State University in the North Central Conference (NCC) during the 1947 college football season. In its first season under head coach Ralph Ginn, the team compiled a 4–5 record and was outscored by a total of 211 to 123.

Schedule

References

South Dakota State
South Dakota State Jackrabbits football seasons
1947 in sports in  South Dakota